Francesco Romani (Vasto, 24 September 1785 – Naples, 14 November 1852) was an Italian medical doctor.

Biography
Francesco Romani was born in Vasto, in 1785. After his first studies in maths, philosophy and literature in the near Chieti, he came back to his hometown where he started to teach literature; just a few months later, he suddenly changed his mind and joined the Naples university of medicine.

He became so famous that Queen Maria Amalia of Naples and Sicily appointed him as her court ordinary doctor. With the Austrian troops who occupied the country in 1822, owing to a revolution, Romani had the great possibility to meet the brilliant homoeopathic Dr Necker that give him his first notions about the Samuel Hahnemann’s therapy. After some treatments on himself, he devoted his soul to the study of this new kind of medicine and soon he succeeded. Romani was the first doctor to introduce the new doctrine of Homeopathy into Italy and spread it abroad  through his several writings.

In 1829, Dr Romani and Cosmo Maria De Horatiis conducted a new homeopathic experiment in the big hospital of Trinity in Naples; for 155 days, with the king Francesco I ‘s agreement, they opened a clinic where the patients were nursed not with normal cures but just with homeopathic ones. Although this new hospital didn’t succeed, they made known that new knowledge.

Romani visited England in the fall of 1830 where he became, for 4 years, the personal homeopathic doctor of the Earl of Shrewsbury. In this short period of residence, he was the first one to introduce the new kind of medicine in all England.
He made several homoeopathic publications during his life and he edited, in 1825, a translation into Italian of Hahnemann’s Materia Medica.

Francesco Romani died in Naples on 14 November 1852.

Principal writings 
 Ricordi sulla peste redatti in un sistema teorico-pratico, Naples 1816, pp.204.
 Sunto sulle annotazioni pratiche sulle malattie degli occhi raccolte ed illustrate da G.B. Quadri, May–September 1819.
 Discorsi sull’Omiopatia, Naples 1835.
 Sui preservativi omeopatici del colera Indiano e sulla disinfettazione degli edifici e dei mobili contagiati, Naples 1836, pp. 48.
 Cenno biografico del Conte Sebastiano De Guidi. Introduzione dell’Omiopatia in Francia", Poliorama, Naples 1837.
 Elogio storico di Samuello Anemanno, Naples 1845, pp. 279.

Bibliography
 Alberto Lodispoto, Storia della Omeopatia in Italia. Storia antica di una terapia moderna, Edizioni Mediterranee, Rome 1987.  
 Francesco Romani, Elogio Storico di Samuello Anemanno, Kessinger Publishing, 1845.
 Giuseppe Pietrocola, I Quaderni del Club "Amici di Vasto", Litografia Centro Stampa, Vasto 1997, n.13

Notes

1785 births
1852 deaths
19th-century Italian physicians
Italian homeopaths
People from Vasto